In enzymology, an adenylylsulfatase is an enzyme that catalyzes the chemical reaction

adenylyl sulfate + H2O  AMP + sulfate + 2H+

Thus, the two substrates of this enzyme are adenylyl sulfate and H2O, whereas its two products are AMP and sulfate.

This enzyme belongs to the family of hydrolases, specifically those acting on acid anhydrides in sulfonyl-containing anhydrides. The systematic name of this enzyme class is adenylyl-sulfate sulfohydrolase. Other names in common use include adenosine 5-phosphosulfate sulfohydrolase, and adenylylsulfate sulfohydrolase. This enzyme participates in sulfur metabolism.

References

 

EC 3.6.2
Enzymes of unknown structure